Ingrid Halvarda Gulbrandsen (11 September 1899 – 3 November 1975) was a Norwegian figure skater. She competed at the 1920 Summer Olympics in Antwerp where she placed sixth. She was Norwegian champion in 1924.

Results

References

External links

Navigation

1899 births
1975 deaths
Sportspeople from Oslo
Norwegian female single skaters
Olympic figure skaters of Norway
Figure skaters at the 1920 Summer Olympics
20th-century Norwegian women